Mero Mound Group or Diamond Bluff Site is an archeological site near Diamond Bluff, Wisconsin, in Pierce County, Wisconsin. It consists of at least two village sites surrounded by hundreds of mounds, including three effigy mounds.  All were constructed from around 1000 AD to 1300 AD.  

It is also known as 47-Pi-2.  As Mero Archeological District, its boundaries were increased in 1992.

See also
National Register of Historic Places listings in Pierce County, Wisconsin

References

Further reading
 The page "The Mero (Diamond Bluff) Site" discusses what has been found at the site and the sequence of investigations.

Mounds in Wisconsin
Native American history of Wisconsin
Buildings and structures in Pierce County, Wisconsin
Archaeological sites on the National Register of Historic Places in Wisconsin
National Register of Historic Places in Pierce County, Wisconsin